List of St. Albert mayors :

Cheri Hebert (1904-1907)
Fleuri Perron (1908)
Lucien Boudreau (1909)
Herbert B. Dawson (1910)
Leon Levasseur (1911-1912)
J. Arthur Giroux (1913-1918)
Alex Perron (1918-1919)
Michael Hogan (1919-1943)
Richard Poirier (1943-1945)
John LeClair (1945-1946)
Eugene Maheux (1946-1947)
Neil M. Ross (1947-1951)
William Veness (1951-1957)
1957–1962: None, designated a New Town, run by a Board of Administrators
William Veness (1962-1965)
John de Bruijn (1965)
Dick Fowler (1965-1968)
Ray Gibbon	(1968-1974)
Richard Plain (1974-1977)
Ronald Harvey (1977-1980)
Dick Fowler (1980-1989)
Ray Gibbon (1989)
Anita Ratchinsky (1989-1998)
Paul Chalifoux (1998-2001)
Richard Plain (2001-2004)
Paul Chalifoux (2004-2007)
Nolan Crouse (2007-2017)
Cathy Heron (2017-present)

References

All information in this page synthesized from St. Albert Historical Society (1985). The Black Robe's Vision, St. Albert: St. Albert Historical Society.

St. Albert, Alberta